Aspidophorus may refer to:
 Aspidophorus, a genus of beetles in the family Sphindidae, synonym of Aspidiphorus
 Aspidophorus, a genus of fishes in the family Agonidae, synonym of Agonus
 Aspidophorus, a genus of worms in the family Chaetonotidae, synonym of Aspidiophorus